Hayes and Harlington is a constituency in the west of London represented in the House of Commons of the UK Parliament since 1997 by John McDonnell of the Labour Party, who also served as the Shadow Chancellor of the Exchequer from 2015 to 2020.

The seat, created in 1950, is 1 of 49 won (held or gained) by a Labour candidate in 2017 from a total of 73 covering London. In the period 1983-1997 the seat was Conservative-represented. From 1981 until 1983 the seat was represented, by defection, by a member of the Social Democratic Party (SDP) which later merged into the Liberal Democrats. From 1950 until 1983 the seat was won by Labour candidates.

Its London Heathrow Airport component has most of the border with Buckinghamshire and Surrey and its shape is near-square with a north-east square attached: Hayes and Yeading.  Harlington is among the lowest-population components of the seat; with Hayes it gives its name to a railway station and with Hayes was the name of an urban district.

Boundaries

1950–1974: The Urban District of Hayes and Harlington.

1974–1983: The London Borough of Hillingdon wards of Belmore, Frogmore, Hayes, South, and Yeading.

1983–2010: The London Borough of Hillingdon wards of Barnhill, Botwell, Charville, Crane, Harlington, Heathrow, Townfield, Wood End, and Yeading.

2010–present: The London Borough of Hillingdon wards of Barnhill, Botwell, Charville, Heathrow Villages, Pinkwell, Townfield, West Drayton, and Yeading.

Constituency profile
The south-west is Heathrow Airport, which is the largest single provider of employment including its many associated businesses, such as retail, international distribution, cargo handling and parking throughout the seat and nearby.  Housing is overwhelmingly semi-detached houses and mid-rise apartments.  The topography is near-flat and features the M4 motorway, mixed-traction Great Western Main Line, and the airport itself.  Newer housing in the seat adjoins the Grand Union Canal and reduced pollution is expected from less diesel rolling stock on the main line. The seat has an income level of earnings slightly below national and Greater London averages. Among its working-age population, the most dominant occupation sectors are manufacturing, distribution, self-employed trades and light industry.

Political history since 1997
McDonnell's majority has fluctuated between 25.4% and 41.6% of the votes cast over his runner-up, which in each election has been the Conservative Party's candidate.  The 2015 result made the seat the 56th safest of the party's 232 seats (by majority percentage).

2016 EU referendum results
The constituency of Hayes and Harlington voted 58.25% leave versus 41.75% to remain; this is in contrast to the public stance of incumbent MP, John McDonnell, at the time of the referendum.

History
The seat since its 1950 creation has in most elections been quite heavily Labour-voting in relative terms (as with its predecessor in the post war years).  In 1981 its Labour MP, Neville Sandelson, defected to the now Liberal-merged Social Democratic Party. Sandelson stood for election for the new party in 1983 which led to a three-way split in the vote which enabled Conservative Terry Dicks to gain the seat in 1983 and retain it in the next two General Elections on marginal majorities (in 1992 being only 53 votes). In 1997, the seat swung heavily back to the Labour candidate McDonnell with his +17.5% swing exceeding that nationally (10% average swing).  McDonnell's majorities have ranged between 21.1% and 41.6% of the votes cast.

Members of Parliament

Election results

Elections in the 2010s

Elections in the 2000s

Elections in the 1990s

Elections in the 1980s

Elections in the 1970s

Elections in the 1960s

Elections in the 1950s

See also
 List of parliamentary constituencies in London

Notes

References

External links 
Politics Resources (Election results from 1922 onwards)
Electoral Calculus (Election results from 1955 onwards)

Politics of the London Borough of Hillingdon
Parliamentary constituencies in London
Constituencies of the Parliament of the United Kingdom established in 1950